The 1996 Badminton Asia Championships was the 15th tournament of the Badminton Asia Championships. It was held at the GOR Pancasila in Surabaya, Indonesia in 17 - 21 April 1996.

Medalists

Medal table

Finals

Semifinals

References

External links
 Asian Championships 1996

Badminton Asia Championships
Asian Badminton Championships
1996 Badminton Asia Championships
Badminton Asia Championships
Badminton Asia Championships